The 2014–15 SV Werder Bremen season is the 105th season in the club's football history. In 2014–15 the club plays in the Bundesliga, the top tier of German football. It is the clubs thirty-second consecutive season in this league, having been promoted from the 2. Bundesliga in 1981.

The club also took part in the 2014–15 edition of the DFB-Pokal.

Competitions

Bundesliga

League table

Results summary

Results by round

Matches

DFB-Pokal

Squad

Squad and statistics

Sources:

|}

References

SV Werder Bremen seasons
Werder Bremen